The Royal Highest Princess Mooryati Soedibyo of Surakarta Sunanate, also known as Hj. DR. BRA. Mooryati Soedibyo, S.S., M. Hum. She's also ranked number 7 on the list of the 99 most influential women in Indonesia 2007 by the Globe Asia magazine. Mooryati Soedibyo was recorded by MURI-Indonesian World Records Museum as the winner of the oldest doctorate in Indonesia, and as "Empu Jamu".

Personal life

A member of a Javanese royal family, she was born in Surakarta, Central Java and grew up in the palace of Surakarta Sunanate. She learned about herbal medicine and traditional Javanese cosmetics from her grandmother; the traditional knowledge preserved by the royal family is considered to be superior to that known by the common people. Soedibyo received a bachelor's degree in English literature from the Indonesia Open University, a master's degree in English literature from the Sebelas Maret University and a PhD in strategic management from the School of Economics at the University of Indonesia. In 1956, she married Soedibyo Purbo Hadiningrat.

The granddaughter of Pakubuwana X she received a traditional education at the palace that emphasized manners, classical dance, karawitan, batik, saliro ngadi busono, knowing nutritious plants, concocting herbs, and traditional cosmetics from natural ingredients, Javanese literary language, songs with mocopat style, Old Javanese script, and other arts.

In 1973, the hobby of drinking herbal medicine Mooryati Soedibyo, which had been done since she was young, finally developed as a business. The concoction of the recipe for Surakarta Sunanate, which was originally given to his friends, turned into a business. 800 products were exported to approximately 20 countries, including Russia, the Netherlands, Japan, South Africa, the Middle East, Malaysia and Brunei.

Soedibyo founded the cosmetics company Mustika Ratu in 1975. The company also operates its own spa resorts. In 2002, she was named Entrepreneur of the Year by Ernst & Young Indonesia.

She has served as a member of the Regional Representative Council and as a member and vice chairperson of the People's Consultative Assembly.

In 1990, Soedibyo acquired the license for the Puteri Indonesia beauty pageant and established herself as the national director.

In 2016, she published an autobiography Menerobos Tradisi Memasuki Dunia Baru, The Untold Story.

References 

1928 births
Living people
Javanese monarchs
host
Beauty pageant owners
21st-century Indonesian women politicians
21st-century Indonesian politicians
Indonesian politicians
Indonesian women in business
Indonesian company founders
20th-century Indonesian businesspeople
20th-century businesswomen
People from Surakarta
University of Indonesia alumni